{{DISPLAYTITLE:C20H24O7}}
The molecular formula C20H24O7 (molar mass: 376.40 g/mol, exact mass: 376.1522 u) may refer to:

 Ailanthone
 Tripdiolide
 Triptolidenol

Molecular formulas